Haidari Football Club (Greek: Α.Ο. Χαϊδαρίου A.O. Haidariou) is a Greek football club, based in Haidari, Athens. It currently plays in the local Athens Football Clubs Association championships, the fifth level of Greek football. The club's biggest achievement was participating in the Beta Ethniki for three consecutive seasons, 2005–06 through 2007–08, as well as reaching the Round of 16 in the 2006–07 Greek Cup following their win against AEK Athens F.C.

The club was founded in 1937 and their first club colours were yellow and black, it changed to blue and red 40 years later.  Their first lower national division entry was in 1986 (Fourth Division) and the first time in the Third Division in 1990.

Results

November 9, 2006: defeated AEK (5-4) in a 32 team level of the 2006 Greek Cup at Stavros Mavrothalassitis Field.

References

External links
Official website 
Athens Football Clubs Association website 

Association football clubs established in 1937
Football clubs in Attica
1937 establishments in Greece